Tianfu mainly refers to the Municipality of Chengdu or the Province of Sichuan. 

Tianfu may refer to:

Locations in China
Sichuan Basin, a lowland region in southwestern China
Tianfu New Area, an in-city development area established in 2011 in Chengdu, China
Chengdu Tianfu International Airport, the second civil international airport of Chengdu, China
Tianfu, Chongqing (天府), a town in Chongqing
Tianfu, Pengxi County (天福), a town in Pengxi County, Sichuan
Tianfu Township (田阜乡), a township in Xingping, Shaanxi

Historical eras
Tianfu (天復, 901–904), era name used by Emperor Zhaozong of Tang (also used briefly in 907 by Wang Jian (Former Shu))
Tianfu (天輔, 1117–1123), era name used by Emperor Taizu of Jin

See also
Thian Hock Keng, also known as Tianfu Temple, a Mazuist temple in Singapore